Mark Andrew Druce (born 3 March 1974) is an English former professional footballer who played as a forward for various teams in the Football League.

References

1974 births
Living people
Footballers from Oxford
English footballers
Association football forwards
Oxford United F.C. players
Rotherham United F.C. players
Hereford United F.C. players
Kidderminster Harriers F.C. players
Woking F.C. players
English Football League players